Naypyidaw International Airport officially spelled Nay Pyi Taw , (previously known as Ela Airport), is located 16 kilometres (10 mi) southeast of Naypyidaw, the capital of Myanmar. Before the foundation of Naypyidaw, this was referred to as the airport of the nearby town of Lewe. The airport officially opened on 19 December 2011.

Expansion project
The airport is able to handle 3.5 million passengers annually. The design of Nay Pyi Daw International Airport was drawn by CPG Consultants Pte., Ltd. Of Singapore. The company previously designed the annex to Yangon International Airport, as well as Singapore's Changi Airport and several airports of Vietnam and Laos. The construction work of the airport, performed by Asia World Company, a Myanmar corporation, began in January 2009.  At the completion of the project, the airport will have two runways and three terminals with modern facilities. The construction is scheduled to proceed in three phases.

Phase 1
Phase 1, scheduled to be completed between 20092011, comprises:
 An airport building that can cope with 3.5 million passengers
 A taxiway with 3700 metres in length and 30.5 metres in width
 A 403 metres long and 336 metres wide apron with a total area of 135,408 square metres where 10 aircraft can park simultaneously
 Boarding bridges
 An annex to the airport
 A control tower
 A car parking and
 Other facilities

Annually, two million international passengers plus 1.5 million local passengers totaling 3.5 million can use the main airport building which is made up of 
 the main hall with an area of 17,174 square metres
 the east hall and west hall with an area of 3224 square metres each
 the north hall with an area of 5912 square metres
The total area of the ground, first and second floors of the building is 63,000 square metres.

The airport building is a two-story building with reinforced concrete boree piles. The ground floor is for passenger arrivals and the first floor for passenger departures. The west hall is for local passengers, the east hall and the north hall for international passengers.

The approach road to the airport with two ways / four lanes is 1500 metres long. The car parking measures 200 metres by 107 metres and its total area is 21,400 square metres. The 62-metre-high control tower can control all the construction tasks of the first, second and third phases of the project.

Phase 2
The second phase of the expansion project includes adding an apron measuring 1200 feet × 1200 feet in front of the already-constructed airport building, an apron where VIP aircraft park and building four more boarding bridges at the airport building for passengers, a flight catering building, a government complex and an airport maintenance base.

Phase 3
The third phase includes adding 17 more boarding bridges, a dual parallel taxiway measuring 1200 ft × 100 ft, a runway measuring 12000 ft × 100 ft in front of the airport building, a set of dual parallel taxiway measuring 12,000 ft × 100 ft, four taxiways measuring 650 ft × 100 ft, four taxiways measuring 550 ft × 100 ft and an apron for cargo planes. After the third phase is completed, the airport will be able to cope with 10.5 million passengers annually and it will be more modern and sophisticated than Yangon International Airport and Mandalay International Airport.

Airlines and destinations

References

External links

Buildings and structures in Naypyidaw
Airports in Myanmar
Airports established in 2011
2011 establishments in Myanmar